The 1973 Corby District Council election were the first elections to the newly created Corby District Council took place on 7 June 1973 . This was on the same day as other local elections.  The Local Government Act 1972 stipulated that the elected members were to shadow and eventually take over from the predecessor corporation on 1 April 1974. The election resulted in Labour gaining control of the council.

Ward-by-Ward Results

Beanfield East Ward (3 seats)

Beanfield West Ward (6 seats)

Forest Gate Ward (3 seats)

Gretton Ward (1 seat)

Lodge Park Ward (3 seats)

Old Town Ward (3 seats)

Pen Green Ward (2 seats)

Rural West Ward (1 seat)

Stanion Ward (1 seat)

Studfall Ward (6 seats)

Town Centre (3 seats)

Weldon Ward (1 seat)

References

1973 English local elections
1973
1970s in Northamptonshire